Suzanápolis is a municipality in the state of São Paulo in Brazil. The population is 4,014 (2020 est.) in an area of 331 km². The elevation is 350 m.

References

Municipalities in São Paulo (state)